Fengshan Single Member Constituency was a former single Member Constituency within Bedok, Singapore. 

The constituency was created in 1984 from parts of Bedok, Changi & Kampong Chai Chee constituencies. As the population in Bedok grew, the constituency was absorbed into the Bedok Group Representation Constituency (GRC) in 1991.

In 2015, the constituency was carved out from East Coast GRC and became Fengshan Single Member Constituency.

In 2020, it was merged back to East Coast GRC.

Member of Parliament

Electoral results

Elections in 1980s

Elections in 2010s

See also
Bedok SMC
Bedok GRC
East Coast GRC

References
1984 GE's result
1988 GE's result
2015 GE's result
Map of Fengshan Constituency (Within Bedok) in 1980 GE
Map of Fengshan Constituency in 1984 GE
Map of Fengshan Constituency in 1988 GE
Map of Fengshan Constituency in 1991 GE (And other nearby wards in Bedok GRC)

1984 establishments in Singapore
1991 disestablishments in Singapore
2015 establishments in Singapore
2020 disestablishments in Singapore
Bedok
Constituencies established in 1984
Constituencies disestablished in 1991
Constituencies established in 2015
Constituencies disestablished in 2020